Diah Permatasari may refer to:

 Diah Permatasari (actress) (born 1971), Indonesian actress and model
 Diah Permatasari (fencer) (born 1990), Indonesian fencer